Lieutenant General Tage Dennis Gyllensporre, né Öztürkmen (born 14 July 1964) is a retired senior Swedish Army officer. Gyllensporre has served as Chief of Policy and Plans Department (2012–2014), Chief of Defence Staff (2014–2018), head of the Swedish Armed Forces Headquarters (2014–2018), head of the Swedish Armed Forces Special Forces (2014–2018) and as the Commandant General in Stockholm (2014–2018). From August 2018 to 2021, Gyllensporre served as Force Commander of the United Nations Multidimensional Integrated Stabilization Mission in Mali (MINUSMA).

Early life
Gyllensporre was born on 14 July 1964 in Skellefteå, Sweden, the son of Güray Öztürkmen, a school counselor, and his first wife Irene Johansson. He and two brothers took the name Gyllensporre. He attended the Royal Institute of Technology from 1985 to 1991 when he received a Master of Science in Computer Science.

Career
Gyllensporre was commissioned as an officer in the Swedish Armed Forces in 1987 and was assigned to Norrland Signal Regiment (S 3) in Boden, where he served as platoon leader and company commander from 1987 to 1995. During this time Gyllensporre also studied at the Swedish National Defence College from 1993 to 1994 and from 1995 to 1997 and he attended the University of Warwick from 1994 to 1997 when he received a Master of Business Administration in Corporate Strategy. He then served as a Nordic-Polish Brigade Liaison Officer to the US Division Headquarters (SFOR) in Tuzla, Bosnia and Herzegovina from 1997 to 1998. Back in Sweden, Gyllensporre served as a Desk Officer for National and NATO/PfP Defence in the Planning Staff (J 5) at the Swedish Armed Forces Headquarters in Stockholm from 1998 to 2000.

He then attended the United States Army Command and General Staff College at Fort Leavenworth in the United States from 2000 to 2001 when he received a Master of Military Arts and Science and the Dwight D. Eisenhower Award as the top international graduate. Back in Sweden, Gyllensporre served as battalion commander, Headquarters Battalion, in the Norrbotten Regiment (I 19) in Boden from 2001 to 2002 and was then military advisor in Department for International and Security Affairs of the Ministry of Defence from 2001 to 2003. Gyllensporre served as Chief Operations Officer of the Joint Military Commission (JMC) in the Nuba Mountains, Sudan from 2003 to 2004 before returning to the Ministry of Defence in Stockholm the same year. In 2005 Gyllensporre passed the Joint and Combined Warfighting School (JCWS) at the Joint Forces Staff College, National Defense University in the United States. The same year he also served as Chief of Staff in the Joint Forces Command (OPIL) in Uppsala. Gyllensporre then served as Chief of Doctrine and Concepts Branch, Policy & Plans Division, European Union Military Staff in Brussels, Belgium from 2005 to 2008.

From January 2007 to November 2010, he attended the Maastricht Graduate School of Governance in Maastricht, Netherlands where he received a PhD in Policy Analysis and Governance. During this time Gyllensporre also served as Chief of Staff of the Regional Command North Headquarters of the International Security Assistance Force (ISAF) in Mazar-i-Sharif, Afghanistan in 2008. Also in 2008, he was appointed Chief of Staff of the Defence Staff (Ledningsstabens stabschef, LEDS SC) in the Swedish Armed Forces Headquarters in Stockholm. In 2010 he left the position and was appointed Director Future Capabilities in the Defence Staff (Ledningsstabens utvecklingsavdelning) in the Swedish Armed Forces Headquarters, Stockholm. In 2011, he attended the Defense Resources Management Institute at the Naval Postgraduate School in the United States. From 2012 to 2014, Gyllensporre served as military advisor in the Swedish Parliamentary Defence Commission (Försvarsberedningen) as well as Chief of Policy and Plans Department in the Swedish Armed Forces Headquarters in Stockholm. On 27 November 2014, Gyllensporre was appointed Chief of Defence Staff. In this position he is also the head of the Swedish Armed Forces Headquarters, head of the Swedish Armed Forces Special Forces and the Commandant General in Stockholm. In 2017 Gyllensporre was introduced to the U.S. Army Command and General Staff College Hall of Fame.

In August 2018 he was appointed by the UN Secretary-General as Force Commander of the United Nations Multidimensional Integrated Stabilization Mission in Mali (MINUSMA). Gyllensporre assumed the position on 1 October 2018. In 2019 the UN Secretary-General extended the appointment one more year, until October 2020. In 2020 the UN Secretary-General made a second extension of the appointment one more year, until October 2021. Gyllensporre is an Associate Professor of the Swedish Defence University from January 2022.

Personal life
In 1992 he married Helena Nordgren (born 1965). They have three children (born 1991, 1993 and 1997).

Dates of rank

1987 – Second lieutenant
1988 – Lieutenant
1991 – Captain
1994 – Major
2000 – Lieutenant colonel
2005 – Colonel
2010 – Brigadier general
2012 – Major general
2014 – Lieutenant general

Awards and decorations

Swedish
   King Carl XVI Gustaf's Jubilee Commemorative Medal III (30 April 2016)
   For Zealous and Devoted Service of the Realm
   Swedish Armed Forces Medal of Merit
   Swedish Armed Forces Conscript Medal
   Swedish Armed Forces International Service Medal
   Commandant General in Stockholm Medal of Merit (Överkommendanten i Stockholms förtjänstmedalj)
   Swedish Reserve Officers Federation Merit Badge (Förbundet Sveriges Reservofficerares förtjänsttecken)
   Norrland Signal Battalion Medal of Merit (Norrlands signalbataljons förtjänstmedalj)
   Norrland Signal Battalion Commemorative Medal (Norrlands signalbataljons minnesmedalj)
etc

Foreign
   German Armed Forces Deployment Medal, ISAF, Afghanistan.
   Officer of the Legion of Honour (17 October 2021)
   Officer of the National Order of Mali
   Cross for the Four Day Marches
   NATO Medal for the former Yugoslavia
   NATO Non-Article 5 medal
   United Nations Medal (MINUSMA), award numeral 6
  Joint Military Commission (JMC) Monitor Medal for the Nuba Mountains in Sudan
etc

Civilian/military academic merits
 Executive Certificate, Harvard University, United States (2017)
 Associate Professor (Docent), Swedish Defence University (2015-), Sweden
 Military non-credit studies, Naval Postgraduate School, United States (2011)
 Doctor of Philosophy, Governance and Policy Analysis Dual Career Programme (2007–2010), Maastricht Graduate School of Governance, Maastricht University, Netherlands
 Military non-credit studies, National Defense University, United States (2005)
 Master of Arts, United States Army Command and General Staff College (2000–2001)
 Military non-credit studies, Swedish National Defence College (1995–1997)
 Master of Business Administration (MBA), Warwick Business School, University of Warwick, United Kingdom (1994–1998)
 Military non-credit studies, Swedish National Defence College (1993–1994)
 Master of Science in Computer Science and Engineering (1985–1991), KTH Royal Institute of Technology, Sweden

Honours
Dwight D. Eisenhower Award as top international graduate of the CGSC (2001)
Member of the Royal Swedish Academy of War Sciences (2011)
Member of the International Hall of Fame, United States Army Command and General Staff College (CGSC) (2017)
Årets Förändringsledare (2022)
Vice President of the Royal Swedish Academy of War Sciences (2022–present)

Bibliography

Books

Articles
 ”Decision Navigation: Coping With 21st-Century Challenges in Tactical Decision-making”. Military Review 83 (5): pp. 20–31. 2003. ISSN 0026-4148.
 ”L’evolution de la Doctrine Militaire de l’UE”. Défense Nationale et Sécurité Collective 64 (2): pp. 73–81. 2008. ISSN 1950-3253.
 ”International Legality, the Use of Military Force, and Burdens of Persuasion: Self-Defense, the Initiation of Hostilities, and the Impact of the Choice Between Two Evils on the Perception of International Legitimacy”. Pace Law   Review 20 (2): pp. 484–543. 2010. ISSN 0272-2410.
 ”Militära reflektioner om officersprofessionen”. Kungliga Krigsvetenskapsakademiens Handlingar och Tidskrift (1.häftet): pp. 23–33. 2014. ISSN 0023-5369.
 ”How much is enough? An examination of military strategic planning at the Swedish Armed Forces”. Kungliga Krigsvetenskapsakademiens Handlingar och Tidskrift (2.häftet): pp. 6–27. 2014. ISSN 0023-5369.
 ”Observing War – Keeping Peace? Unpacking the Military Strategy of UN Non-Force Missions”. Journal of International Peacekeeping 18 (3-4): pp. 290–317. 2014. ISSN 1875-4104.
 ”Minding the Gap between Words and Deeds: Towards a New EU Strategy on Security”. European Foreign Affairs Review 20 (1): pp. 3–22. 2015. ISSN 1384-6299.
 ”On the future of conventional warfare: From closed minds to open systems”. Kungliga Krigsvetenskapsakademiens Handlingar och Tidskrift (4.häftet): pp. 136–147. 2015. ISSN 0023-5369

References

External links

1964 births
Living people
Swedish people of Turkish descent
Swedish Army lieutenant generals
People from Skellefteå Municipality
Members of the Royal Swedish Academy of War Sciences
KTH Royal Institute of Technology alumni
Alumni of Warwick Business School
Maastricht University alumni
United States Army Command and General Staff College alumni
Swedish officials of the United Nations
Officers of the National Order of Mali